The silver warehou, Seriolella punctata, is a medusafish of the family Centrolophidae found in the southern Indian and southern Pacific oceans, at depths of between 100 and 650 m.  Its length is up to about 65 cm.

References

 
 Tony Ayling & Geoffrey Cox, Collins Guide to the Sea Fishes of New Zealand, (William Collins Publishers Ltd, Auckland, New Zealand 1982) 

Centrolophidae
Fish described in 1801